Roderick Jones may refer to:
Roderick Jones (journalist), (1877–1962), British director of Reuters 
Roderick Jones (baritone) (1910–1992), Welsh opera singer
Roddy Jones (born 1944), British Olympic swimmer

See also
Rod Jones (disambiguation)